The 2017 Northeastern Midget Association  is the 65th season of the Northeastern Midget Association. The series began at Thompson Speedway Motorsports Park on April 1, and ends with the 55th World Series of Speedway Racing at Thompson Speedway Motorsports Park on October 14. John Zych Jr. is the defending champion.

References

Northeastern Midget Association